Too Hot to Handle (released in the United States as Playgirl After Dark) is a 1960 British neo-noir crime thriller film directed by Terence Young and starring Jayne Mansfield, Leo Genn and Carl Boehm. Christopher Lee appears in a supporting role.

Plot
Johnny Solo, the owner of the Pink Flamingo club in London's Soho area, battles with rival club owner Diamonds Dinelli and the police. When Johnny receives threats and demands for protection, he fights back.

Johnny's girlfriend Midnight Franklin, one of the club's headliners, wants him to leave the business. In the background are a sadistic client, an underage chorus girl, a wisecracking siren who is not averse to rough trade, a visiting journalist and a dancer who guards her past.

The journalist becomes involved in the strip scene while writing a story on the clubs. The competition between the two clubs intensifies. Johnny unknowingly plays a part in the death of the chorus girl. Midnight informs on him to save him from the violent blackmailers who are pursuing him.

Cast
 Jayne Mansfield as Midnight Franklin
 Leo Genn as Johnny Solo
 Carl Boehm as Robert Jouvel
 Christopher Lee as Novak
 Danik Patisson as Lilliane Decker
 Patrick Holt as Inspector West
 Kai Fischer as Cynthia
 Barbara Windsor as Ponytail

Background
Too Hot to Handle was Mansfield's first film away from 20th Century Fox after achieving stardom in the mid-1950s. However, her box-office popularity had faded, and Fox loaned her to other studios while awaiting a suitable film for her. This film had incorporated the title of Some Like It Hot starring Marilyn Monroe, Tony Curtis and Jack Lemmon released in 1959.

The film was billed as "an exposé of 'sexy, sordid Soho, England's greatest shame'." Mansfield's risqué see-through clothing and the film's racy musical numbers caused some controversy that delayed the American release until January 1961, and the sexiest frames were displayed in Playboy magazine. For its American release, Too Hot to Handle was retitled Playgirl After Dark and was edited to meet censor requirements. Halliwell's Film & Video Guide described the film as a "[r]otten, hilarious British gangster film set in a totally unreal underworld and very uncomfortably cast."

The film was shot in England from 10 August until around October 1959.

Filming was temporarily halted at the order of Actors' Equity when £100,000 of the budget failed to materialize, partly because of the illness of Sydney Box, who was slated to produce.

References

External links
 
 
 
 Film summary at The New York Times

1960 films
1960 crime drama films
1960s British films
1960s crime thriller films
1960s English-language films
British crime drama films
British crime thriller films
British gangster films
Film noir
Films directed by Terence Young
Films scored by Eric Spear
Films set in London
Films shot at MGM-British Studios
Films shot in London